Saeed Al-Mutairi  (born September 24, 1968 in Riyadh) is a Saudi Arabian sport shooter. Al-Mutairi made his official debut for the 1996 Summer Olympics in Atlanta, where he placed thirty-second in men's skeet shooting, with a hit of 117 targets, tying his position with five other shooters, including six-time Olympian and former silver medalist Eric Swinkels of the Netherlands. He managed to score 119 points for his category at the 2000 Summer Olympics in Sydney, and eventually achieved his best career result at the 2004 Summer Olympics in Athens, when he shot a total 120 targets in the qualifying rounds, finishing only in seventeenth place.

At the 2008 Summer Olympics in Beijing, Al-Mutairi made his fourth appearance in men's skeet shooting, with a slight preparation and reluctant training. Unlike his three previous games, he struggled to attain a higher position in the qualifying rounds, shooting less than twenty-five clay targets in each of five successive attempts. Because of his poor performance and tough competition, Al-Mutairi finished only in thirty-ninth place at the end of two-day qualifying rounds, for a total score of 104 points.

At the 2020 Summer Olympics in Tokyo, Al-Mutairi made his fifth appearance in men's skeet shooting, but his final score of 119 was not enough to see him progress despite a second day of qualification that saw him claim a perfect score of 25 in the first round, and 23 in the second, for a total of 48 out of 50.

References

External links
NBC 2008 Olympics profile

1968 births
Living people
Saudi Arabian male sport shooters
Olympic shooters of Saudi Arabia
Shooters at the 1996 Summer Olympics
Shooters at the 2000 Summer Olympics
Shooters at the 2004 Summer Olympics
Shooters at the 2008 Summer Olympics
Shooters at the 2020 Summer Olympics
Sportspeople from Riyadh
Asian Games medalists in shooting
Shooters at the 1994 Asian Games
Shooters at the 2002 Asian Games
Shooters at the 2006 Asian Games
Shooters at the 2010 Asian Games
Shooters at the 2014 Asian Games
Shooters at the 2018 Asian Games
Asian Games gold medalists for Saudi Arabia
Medalists at the 1994 Asian Games